Murrumba is a rural locality in the Somerset Region, Queensland, Australia.

History 
The name Murrumba is an Aboriginal word combination, in the Kabi language, meaning good spirit or good place.

Murrumba State School opened on 6 September 1910. It closed on 8 March 1964. That section of Murrumba Road no longer exists as it was realigned due to the construction of Lake Wivenhoe, but originally the road continued east to the Murrumba Bridge over the Brisbane River. The school's location is now in the foreshore area of the lake and hence part of the locality of Lake Wivenhoe.

References

Further reading 

  — also includes Mount Beppo State School, Ivorys Creek Provisional School, Cross Roads Provisional School, Ottaba Provisional School, Murrumba State School, Mount Esk Pocket School, Kipper Provisional School, Lower Cressbrook School, Fulham School, Sandy Gully State School, Cooeeimbardi State School, Scrub Creek State School

Suburbs of Somerset Region
Localities in Queensland